WZLP-LP (95.7 FM) is a radio station licensed to serve the community of Loudonville, Ohio. The station is owned by Zion Evangelical Lutheran Church. It airs a religious format.

The station was assigned the WZLP-LP call letters by the Federal Communications Commission on January 29, 2003.

WZLP is the callsign of the fictional radio station in the 1986 horror film "Trick or Treat" Trick or Treat (1986 film)

References

External links
 Official Website
 

ZLP-LP
Moody Radio affiliate stations
Radio stations established in 2003
2003 establishments in Ohio
Ashland County, Ohio
ZLP-LP
Lutheranism in Ohio